Eva Hodanová (born ) is a Czech female volleyball player, playing as an outside-spiker. She is part of the Czech Republic women's national volleyball team.

She competed at the 2015 Women's European Volleyball Championship. She competed in the 2015 FIVB Volleyball World Grand Prix. On club level she plays for PVK Olymp Praha.

References

1993 births
Living people
Czech women's volleyball players
Place of birth missing (living people)
Outside hitters